Elachista ornithopodella is a moth of the family Elachistidae. It is found from Finland to northern Italy and from Germany to Romania.

The larvae feed on Carex montana, Carex ornithopoda and Carex sempervirens. They mine the leaves of their host plant. The mine is flat and white and descends from the leaf tip. Pupation takes place outside of the mine. They are yellowish with a pair of red length lines and a brown head. Larvae can be found in May.

References

ornithopodella
Moths described in 1859
Moths of Europe